The women's 200 breaststroke event at the 11th FINA World Aquatics Championships swam 28–29 July 2005 in Montreal, Canada. Preliminary and Semifinal heats swam on 28 July, with the Prelims during the morning session and the Semifinals during the evening session. The Final
 swam in the evening session on 29 July.

At the start of the event, the existing World (WR) and Championships (CR) records were:
WR: 2:22.44, Amanda Beard (USA) swum 12 July 2004 in Long Beach, USA
CR: 2:22.99, Amanda Beard (USA) swum 25 July 2003 in Barcelona, Spain

Results

Preliminaries

Semifinals

Final

References

Swimming at the 2005 World Aquatics Championships
2005 in women's swimming